Ready schools are schools that help prepare younger kids for kindergarten. The concept of ready schools is part of the larger school readiness movement.

References 
National Educational Goals Panel (1998). Ready Schools. Washington, DC: Author.
Report of the Ready for School Goal Team (2000). School Readiness in North Carolina Strategies for Defining, measuring, and Promoting Success FOR ALL CHILDREN. North Carolina Office of Education Reform. Available from 
Simons, K.A., & Curtis, P. A. (March, 2007). Connecting with communities: Four successful schools. Young Children (62)2, 12–20.

School types